Christina Hutchins is an American poet. She was the first poet laureate of Albany, California from 2008 to 2012. She is widely published and has won several awards for her poetry. Her second book Tender the Maker won the 2015 May Swenson Poetry Award, and her chapbook Radiantly We Inhabit the Air won the 2011 Robin Becker Prize. In 2017 she became a Dartmouth Poet in Residence. Hutchins was born in San Jose, California and educated at University of California at Davis, Harvard University, and holds a Ph.D. from the Graduate Theological Union

Works

Collections
Tender the Maker Utah State University Press (2015)
The Stranger Dissolves Sixteen Rivers Press (2011)

Chapbooks
Radiantly We Inhabit the Air Seven Kitchens Press (2011) 
Collecting Light Acacia Books (1999)

See also 

 List of municipal poets laureate in California

References

People from Albany, California
American women poets
Graduate Theological Union alumni
Harvard University alumni
Municipal Poets Laureate in the United States
People from San Jose, California
University of California, Davis alumni
Writers from San Jose, California
Year of birth missing (living people)
Living people